HR 4339 is a single star in the equatorial constellation of Hydra. It was designated as Beta Antliae by Lacaille, and Gould intended to keep it in that constellation. However, the delineating of constellation boundaries by the IAU in 1930 saw it transferred to Hydra. It has a white hue and is just visible to the naked eye with an apparent visual magnitude of 5.79. The distance to this star, as determined from parallax measurements, is approximately 366 light years. It is drifting further away with a radial velocity of +1.3 km/s.

This object is an A-type main-sequence star with a stellar classification of A1V. It is a suspected variable star of unknown type and magnitude. The star has 2.6 times the mass of the Sun and it is spinning with a projected rotational velocity of 73 km/s. It is radiating around 72 times the luminosity of the Sun from its photosphere at an effective temperature of 9,120 K.

References

A-type main-sequence stars
Suspected variables

097023
054561
Hydra (constellation)
4339
Durchmusterung objects